Nusrat Khan may refer to:

 Nusrat Khan Jalesari (died 1301), a general and nobleman from medieval India
 Nasir-ud-din Nusrat Shah Tughluq (r. 1394-1398), medieval Indian ruler
 Nasrat Khan (b. 1926), a Guantanamo detainee
 Nusrat Fateh Ali Khan (1948-1997), Pakistani musician